Mame Tacko Diouf (born 17 October 1976) is a retired Senegalese hurdler.

Competition record

Personal bests
100 metres hurdles - 12.94 s (2000)
400 metres hurdles - 54.75 s (1999)
200 metres - 23.43 s (2000)
400 metres - 53.96 s (2003)

References

External links

1976 births
Living people
Senegalese female hurdlers
Serer sportspeople
Olympic athletes of Senegal
Athletes (track and field) at the 2000 Summer Olympics
Athletes (track and field) at the 2004 Summer Olympics
World Athletics Championships athletes for Senegal
African Games gold medalists for Senegal
African Games medalists in athletics (track and field)
Athletes (track and field) at the 1999 All-Africa Games